Cobalt phosphate is the inorganic compound with the formula Co3(PO4)2.  It is a commercial inorganic pigment known as cobalt violet.  Thin films of this material are water oxidation catalysts.

Preparation and structure
The tetrahydrate Co3(PO4)2•4H2O precipitates as a solid upon mixing aqueous solutions of cobalt(II) and phosphate salts.  Upon heating, the tetrahydrate converts to the anhydrous material.  According to X-ray crystallography, the anhydrous Co3(PO4)2 consists of discrete phosphate anions that link  centres.  The cobalt ions occupy both octahedral (six-coordinate) and pentacoordinate sites in a 1:2 ratio.

See also
 List of inorganic pigments

References

Phosphates
Cobalt(II) compounds
Inorganic pigments